The Institute of Forest Productivity (IFP)  is a research institute situated in Ranchi in state of Jharkhand. It works under the Indian Council of Forestry Research and Education (ICFRE) of  the Ministry of Environment, Forest and Climate Change, Government of India.

See also
 Van Vigyan Kendra (VVK) Forest Science Centres

References

1993 establishments in Bihar
Indian forest research institutes
Indian Council of Forestry Research and Education
Ministry of Environment, Forest and Climate Change
Research institutes in Jharkhand
Research institutes established in 1993